"Black Is the Color (of My True Love's Hair)" (Roud 3103) is a traditional ballad folk song known in the US as associated with colonial and later music in the Appalachian Mountains. It is believed to have originated in Scotland, as it refers to the River Clyde in the lyrics. American musicologist Alan Lomax supported the thesis of Scottish origin, saying that the song was an American "re-make of British materials."

Different versions

Many different versions of this song exist, some addressed to men and others addressed to women. There are other differences:

 ...like some rosy fair... or ...like a rose so fair... or ... something wondrous fair
 ...the prettiest face and the neatest hands... or ...the sweetest face and the gentlest hands... or ...the clearest eyes and the strongest hands 
 ...still I hope the time will come... or ...some times I wish the day will come... or ... I shall count my life as well begun, when he and I shall be as one.
 ...you and I shall be as one... or ...s/he and I can be as one...

These words are set to two distinct melodies, one of which is traditional and the other was written by the Kentucky folk singer and composer John Jacob Niles by 1941. Niles recalled that his father thought the traditional melody was "downright terrible", so he wrote "a new tune, ending it in a nice modal manner." This melody was used in the Folk Songs song cycle by Luciano Berio.

The song has become a part of the traditional repertory of Celtic music artists. The song was collected as "Black is the color" by Cecil Sharp and Maud Karpeles in 1916 from Mrs Lizzie Roberts. It appeared in Sharps English Folksongs From The Southern Appalachians (1932). In the 1960s, Patty Waters sang an extended version for an ESP record that leaned toward the avant garde and extremes of vocal improvisation.

Recorded versions

Versions of the song have been recorded by many artists, including:

Settings
 1964 - Luciano Berio - Folk Songs

Pop culture references

"Black Is the Color" is featured in The Twilight Zone season 3 episode entitled "The Passersby", which aired on October 6, 1961.

"Black Is The Color" is featured in the 1962 pilot for the western TV series Gallaway House, starring Johnny Cash, Merle Travis, Karen Downs and Eddie Dean.

"Black is the Color" is featured in The Flame and the Flower by Kathleen E. Woodiwiss. A sailor sings it to Heather as she and her new husband, Brandon Birmingham, pass by on the way to an inn before leaving London.

The "Lover's Lament" / "Love's Jewels" lyrics sung in Anne Bishop's Tir Alainn book series are loosely based on this song.

A cover of the song by Jim Moray featured on the Class season 1 finale "The Lost", appearing in both the post credit opening and closing fight sequence.

A cover of the song by Cara Dillon featured on Derry Girls (2018 TV series) season 3, episode 4 ‘The Haunting’ ending sequence.

References

External links
 Song lyrics

Nina Simone songs
Jo Stafford songs
Burl Ives songs
Jean Ritchie songs
American folk songs
Year of song unknown